Turning to Crime is the twenty-second studio album by British rock band Deep Purple, released on 26 November 2021. It is composed entirely of covers, and is the last Deep Purple album to feature guitarist Steve Morse before he left the band in July 2022.

Background and recording
Turning to Crime was created following a suggestion by Bob Ezrin, who has been Deep Purple's producer since 2013. Released about fifteen months after Whoosh!, this marked the first time since 1975's Come Taste the Band that Deep Purple had released a new studio album just one year after their previous one.

The track The Battle of New Orleans marks the first time Roger Glover has performed vocals of any kind on a Deep Purple studio recording.

A 13th Track (I'm a) Road Runner was released as a download for describers on October 6th, 2021 and later on the Limited Edition 5×12″ Vinyl Box Set, as the b'side of 7 and 7 is.

Track listing

Personnel 

Credits per discogs

Deep Purple
Ian Gillan – vocals (all tracks), backing vocals (2, 4, 5, 7, 8, 10, 11), percussion (3, 7)
Steve Morse – guitars (all tracks), vocals (9)
Roger Glover – bass (all tracks), additional keyboards (1), backing vocals and percussion (7), vocals (9)
Ian Paice – drums (all tracks)
Don Airey – keyboards (all tracks)

Musicians
Bob Ezrin – backing vocals (2, 5, 7, 8, 10–12), vocals (9)
Leo Green – tenor saxophone (2, 6), horns arrangement (2)
Matt Holland – trumpet (2, 6)
Nicole Thalia – backing vocals (4, 6, 12)
Marsha B. Morrison – backing vocals (4, 6, 12)
Gina Forsyth – fiddle (9)
Bruce Daigrepont – squeeze box (9)
Julian Shank – percussion (10)

Charts

Weekly charts

Year-end charts

References 

2021 albums
Deep Purple albums
Edel AG albums
Albums produced by Bob Ezrin
Covers albums
Albums impacted by the COVID-19 pandemic